Colathur Rama Krishnaswamy Rao Sahib  (2 February 1927 – 12 February 2013) was an Indian civil servant who served as 15th Cabinet Secretary of India from 1981-1985. He also served as the Secretary to Prime Minister Charan Singh. when Indira Gandhi became the Prime Minister of India. He was awarded the second highest civilian honor of India, Padma Vibhushan in 2006, besides the Great Maratha Award in 2009. His maternal grandfather was R. Ramachandra Rao, Collector of Nellore, who helped Srinivasa Ramanujan during the latter's formative years.

Life
Krishnaswamy Rao Sahib was born in a prominent Deshastha Madhva Brahmin family on 2 February 1927 in Madras, British India. The family is connected to Arni Jagir family, Rao Sahib belongs to the junior branch of the Colathur family. Rao Sahib became a family title when the Sultanate of Bijapur conferred it on his ancestor Vedaji Bhaskar Rao Pant. His maternal grandfather was R. Ramachandra Rao, Collector of Nellore, who helped Srinivasa Ramanujan during the latter's formative years.  Rao Sahib attended P.S. Higher Secondary School before receiving Bachelor of Science in physics from the Presidency College, Chennai. Rao Sahib joined Indian Administrative Service on 1 February 1950.

Accolades
He was also a great visionary. Dr. A P J Abdul Kalam credits him with propelling the idea of Integrated Guided Missile Programme of India during the 1980s, when there was tremendous criticism from the Armed forces that, not a single missile had been successfully developed so far.

Notes

1927 births
2013 deaths
People from Nellore
Cabinet Secretaries of India
Rai Sahibs
Recipients of the Padma Vibhushan in civil service
Indian Administrative Service officers